The Sanford Hotel, also known as the Conant Hotel, is a historic seven-story building in Omaha, Nebraska. It was built as a hotel for Dr. Harold Gifford, an ophthalmologist, self-professed socialist, and real estate investor, in 1916–1917. The hotel was managed by Harley Conant, who renamed it the Conant Hotel in 1939. The building was designed in the Chicago school style by architect John Latenser Sr. It has been listed on the National Register of Historic Places since September 26, 1985.

References

National Register of Historic Places in Omaha, Nebraska
Chicago school architecture in the United States
Hotel buildings completed in 1916
1916 establishments in Nebraska